(Thus Spoke Zarathustra or Thus Spake Zarathustra) is the oil painting cycle by Lena Hades painted from 1995 to 1997 and inspired by Friedrich Nietzsche's philosophical novel of the same name. The painter created her first painting on December 1995 in Moscow. The Thus Spake Zarathustra cycle is a series of twenty-eight oil paintings made by the artist from 1995 to 1997 and thirty graphic works made in 2009. Twenty-four of the paintings depict so-called round-headed little men and their struggles in life. The remaining four depict Zarathustra himself, his eagle and serpent. Six paintings of the series were purchased by the Moscow Museum of Modern Art and by some important private collectors. The oil painting Also Sprach Zarathustra series was exhibited several times — including the exhibition at the Institute of Philosophy of the Russian Academy of Sciences in 1997 and at the First Moscow Biennale of contemporary art in 2005.

In 2004, a bilingual edition of Nietzsche's book Also sprach Zarathustra was published in Russian and German by the Institute of Philosophy of the Russian Academy of Sciences. The edition includes 20 Hades paintings from this cycle and the art critical essays written by three art historians Alexander Yakimovich, Olga Yushkowa and Jean-Christophe Ammann, professor at the Goethe University Frankfurt in Frankfurt and the director of the Museum of Modern Art in 1991-2001.

Paintings
All paintings of the cycle the artist herself calls visual metaphors to the book and not illustrations.

In Lena Hades' interview with Nietzsche.ru portal, she told about the prehistory of the cycle:

Painting perception
Jean-Christophe Ammann called the painting of the series tablets. "Figurative language of Lena Hades expresses itself often intentionally as a poster, because we see here some visual tablets which should stir and awaken. At the same time, the language of her images remains faithful to the fundamental task of the artist: every artist should be a dervish, not only in order to conjure the collective memory, being in constant motion, but also to stay in the thought and memory of our times. Lena Hades is a dervish."

Publications

References

Sources

External links
Lena Hades' works
Lena Hades' blog

Adaptations of works by Friedrich Nietzsche
Painting series
Cultural depictions of Zoroaster
Thus Spoke Zarathustra
Paintings based on literature